The Chinese Elm cultivar Ulmus parvifolia 'Churchyard' was raised by Fleming's Nurseries in Victoria, Australia, propagated from a Chinese Elm growing in Melbourne.

Description
'Churchyard' is distinguished by its pendant branch tips and thickly textured foliage. The tree is of moderately rapid growth, ultimately achieving a rounded habit, approximately 10 m high and 10 m wide. The leaves, 5 cm long, turn a golden orange colour in autumn. The samarae are rounded, 9 mm in diameter, and are shed in late autumn.

Pests and diseases
The species and its cultivars are highly resistant, but not immune, to Dutch elm disease, and unaffected by the Elm Leaf Beetle Xanthogaleruca luteola.

Cultivation
'Churchyard' is not known to be in cultivation beyond Australia.

Accessions
None known.

Nurseries

Australasia

Fleming's Nursery , Monbulk, Victoria, Australia.

References

Chinese elm cultivar
Ulmus articles missing images
Ulmus